The 2004 United States Senate elections were held on November 2, 2004, with all Class 3 Senate seats being contested. They coincided with the re-election of George W. Bush as president and the United States House election, as well as many state and local elections. Senators who were elected in 1998, known as Senate Class 3, were seeking re-election or retiring in 2004. 

Republicans won six seats but lost two themselves, giving them a net gain of four seats. Five of the six gains came from Southern states. Conservative Democrat Zell Miller of Georgia, who campaigned for President Bush, chose not to run for re-election and Republican Johnny Isakson won his seat; Democrat Fritz Hollings of South Carolina chose not to run for re-election and was succeeded by Republican Jim DeMint; Democratic vice presidential nominee John Edwards chose not to run for re-election and Republican Richard Burr won his North Carolina seat; Democrat Bob Graham of Florida chose not to run for re-election, and his seat went to Republican Mel Martinez; and Louisiana Democrat John Breaux chose not to run for re-election and Republican David Vitter won his seat.

In South Dakota, Republican John Thune defeated the incumbent Senate minority leader Tom Daschle, marking the first time since 1952 that a sitting party leader lost re-election. Republican Senator Peter Fitzgerald of Illinois chose not to run for re-election and Democrat Barack Obama won in a landslide, becoming the Senate's only black member and only the third popularly elected since Reconstruction. Also, Republican Senator Ben Nighthorse Campbell of Colorado chose not to run for re-election and Democrat Ken Salazar won the open seat.

This was the third consecutive election for Senate Class 3 where the Democrats either broke even or lost seats. This also marked the first time since 1980 in which a presidential candidate from either party won with coattails in the Senate. , these are the last elections held during a Presidential election year in which the Republicans made a net gain of seats. Furthermore, this was the most recent election in which a Senate party leader lost reelection. Barack Obama, the 44th President of the United States, was first elected to the Senate from Illinois in this election.

Results summary

Summary of the United States Senate elections, 2004 results
{| class=wikitable style=text-align:center
|-
! colspan=2 rowspan=2 | Parties
| style="background-color:" |
| style="background-color:" |
| style="background-color:" |
| style="background-color:" |
| style="background-color:" |
! rowspan=2 | Total
|-
! Democratic
! Republican
! Independent
! Libertarian
! Others
|-
! colspan=2 | Before these elections
! 48
!  | 51
! 1
! —
! —
! 100
|-
! colspan=2 | End of this Congress (two months later)
! 48
!  | 51
! 1
| —
| —
! 100
|-
! colspan=2 | Not Up
| 29
|  | 36
! 1
| —
| —
! 66
|-
! colspan=2 | Up
|  | 19
| 15
| —
| —
| —
! 34
|- 
| colspan=99 |
|-
! rowspan=4 style="background:#ccc" | Incumbentretired
! Total before
|  | 5
| 3
| —
| —
| —
! 8
|-
! Held by same party
| —
|  | 1
| —
| —
| —
! 1
|-
! Replaced by other party
| colspan="2"  |  2 Republicans replaced by  2 Democrats 5 Democrats replaced by  5 Republicans
| —
| —
| —
! 7
|-
! Result after
| 2
|  | 6
| —
| —
| —
! 8
|-
! rowspan=6 style="background:#cccccc" | Incumbentran
! Total before
|  | 14
| 12
| —
| —
| —
! 26
|-
! Won re-election
|  | 13
| 12
| —
| —
| —
! 25
|-
! Lost re-election
| colspan=2  |  1 Democrat replaced by  1 Republican
| —
| —
| —
! 1
|-
! Lost renomination, held by same party
| —
| —
| —
| —
| —
! 0
|-
! Lost renomination, and party lost
| —
| —
| —
| —
| —
! 0
|-
! Result after
| 13
| 13
| —
| —
| —
! 26
|-
! colspan=2 | Net gain/loss
|  4
|  |  4
| —
| —
| —
! 4
|-
! colspan=2 | Total elected
| 15
|  | 19
| —
| —
| —
! 34
|- 
| colspan=99 |
|-
! colspan=2 | Result
! 44
!  | 55
! 1
! —
! —
! 100
|- 
| colspan=99 |
|-
! rowspan=2 style="background:#cccccc" | Popularvote
! Votes
!  | 44,754,618
| 39,920,562
| 186,231
| 754,861
| 2,481,075
! 88,097,347
|-
! Share
!  | 50.80%
| 45.31%
| 0.21%
| 0.86%
| 2.82%
! 100%
|-

Sources:
 Dave Leip's Atlas of U.S. Elections
 United States Elections Project at George Mason University

Change in composition

Before the elections

After the elections

Gains and losses

Retirements
Three Republican and five Democrats retired instead of seeking re-election.

Defeats
One Democrat sought re-election but lost in the general election.

Political parties

The Senate, as of the pre-election 108th Congress, was composed of 51 Republicans, 48 Democrats, and 1 independent. (The independent, Jim Jeffords of Vermont, was allied with the Democratic caucus and had voted with Democrats to give them the majority in the past.) The Democrats, therefore, needed to make a net gain of at least two seats from retiring or incumbent Republicans to gain control of the Senate (one seat if Kerry won the presidency). In the election, incumbent senators won reelection in all races but one (Democratic leader Tom Daschle, in South Dakota, lost to Republican John Thune). The seats of retiring senators were taken by the opposing party in Colorado, Florida, Georgia, Illinois, Louisiana, North Carolina, and South Carolina. In fact, the only retiring senator whose seat was taken by a member of his party was Republican Don Nickles of Oklahoma, who was succeeded by Tom Coburn.

Republicans gained four seats in the 2004 elections, and entered the 109th Congress with a 55–44–1 lead. While such a majority is formidable, it is still less than the 60 seats needed to override a filibuster and completely control the body's agenda and procedures.

One Republican seat, that of retiring Senator Peter Fitzgerald in Illinois, was easily taken by Democrat Barack Obama, who would be elected President of the United States four years later. In Colorado, retiring Senator Ben Nighthorse Campbell's seat was narrowly taken by Democrat Ken Salazar. In Alaska, Republican Lisa Murkowski won reelection in a tight race. In Oklahoma, Tom Coburn kept Don Nickles' seat in Republican hands, while in Kentucky, Republican Jim Bunning won a second term by a very narrow margin.

The Democrats' prospects were weakened by the fact that five of their incumbent senators in Southern states were retiring. Those were Georgia Sen. Zell Miller's seat, contested by Denise Majette, was lost in a landslide, as was that of South Carolina Sen. Ernest Hollings. In North Carolina, Democrat Erskine Bowles lost John Edwards's seat to Republican Richard Burr. Especially close races in Florida, Louisiana, and South Dakota all resulted in turnovers to the Republicans. South Dakota was the only non-Southern state gained from Democrat to Republican.

The Libertarian, Constitution, and Green parties contested many of the seats. No candidate from any of these parties received sufficient support to achieve election, but some may have affected the outcome of the Alaska and Florida races by drawing votes away from the major party candidates. Of the 34 senate seats up for grabs, the Libertarians ran candidates in 20 of the races, the Constitutionalists ran 10 candidates, and the Greens ran 7 candidates.

Minor parties in a number of states contested one or more Senate seats. Examples include the America First Party, the Labor Party, the Peace and Freedom Party, and the Socialist Workers Party. None of these parties gained a seat in this election nor received a significant number of votes.

Race summary

Special elections during the 108th Congress 
There were no special elections during the 108th Congress.

Elections leading to the next Congress 
In these general elections, the winners were elected for the term beginning January 3, 2005; ordered by state.

All of the elections involved the Class 3 seats.

Closest races 

In seven races the margin of victory was under 10%.

Alabama 

Incumbent Republican Richard Shelby won re-election to a fourth term over Democratic perennial candidate Wayne Sowell

Shelby, who switched parties ten years prior, had over $11 million cash on hand. Shelby was chairman of the Banking Committee. Wayne Sowell became the first black U.S. Senate nominee of a major party in Alabama.

Alaska 

Incumbent Republican Lisa Murkowski of Anchorage, sought election to her first full term after being appointed to serve out the rest of her father's unexpired term when he resigned in December 2002 to become Governor of Alaska. Her main challenger was Democratic former Governor Tony Knowles, her father's predecessor as governor. Murkowski won by a slight margin.

Although Alaska is heavily Republican, popular opinion had swung against the Murkowski family because of a tax increase passed by Governor Frank Murkowski, Lisa Murkowski's father. In addition, many voters disapproved of apparent nepotism in the appointment of Lisa Murkowski to the Senate. Knowles, who as mentioned above preceded Frank Murkowski as governor, had enlisted extensive out-of-state support for his bid to take over Lisa Murkowski's Senate seat. However, veteran Republican Senator Ted Stevens taped advertisements warning Alaskans that electing a Democrat could result in less federal dollars for Alaska.

Lisa Murkowski had very low approval ratings as senator due to her father, Frank Murkowski, who at the time was the Governor of Alaska with extremely low approval ratings himself. Former Governor Tony Knowles ran against Murkowski. He ran as a Democrat who supported drilling in ANWR, in contrast to most Democrats. Ted Stevens tried to "rescue" her campaign and help her maintain her seat.

Arizona 

Incumbent Republican John McCain won re-election to a fourth term with his largest victory over Democratic teacher Stuart Starky.

Since 1998, McCain challenged Texas Governor George W. Bush in the Presidential primary and despite winning the New Hampshire primary, he lost the nomination. Solidifying his image as a maverick, he voted against the Bush tax cuts. He supported limits on stem cell research. He had a lopsided favorable ratings of 39% to 9% unfavorable in the most recent The New York Times/CBS News poll.

Stuart Starky, an eighth-grade teacher in South Phoenix, was widely known as a long-shot challenger. Starky stated that "I truly believe he's going to run for president again." Starky was called by The Arizona Republic a "sacrificial lamb" put on ballot because there were no chances to beat McCain. During his campaign, he debated McCain twice, once in Tucson and once in Flagstaff. He was also featured on the cover of Teacher Magazine, dubbed the "Unsinkable Stu Starky." Starky was defeated in a landslide. But, despite the relatively low percentage, he gained the highest vote per dollar amount in the country, spending only about $15,000 for his campaign (Starky's campaign may have been aided by John Kerry running for president).

Arkansas 

Incumbent Democrat Blanche Lincoln ran for re-election. Lincoln won re-election over Republican State Senator Jim Holt while President George W. Bush carried the state with almost the same margin of victory.

The Democratic Party held super-majority status in the Arkansas General Assembly. A majority of local and statewide offices were also held by Democrats. This was rare even for the time in the South, where a majority of statewide offices were and still are held by Republicans. Arkansas had the distinction in 1992 of being the only state in the country to give the majority of its vote to a single candidate in the presidential election—native son Bill Clinton—while every other state's electoral votes were won by pluralities of the vote among the three candidates. Arkansas had since become more reliably Republican in presidential elections. The state voted for George W. Bush over John Kerry in 2004. Lincoln won by 2% less than she had in 1998.

Democrats at the time had an overwhelming majority of registered voters, and the Democratic Party of Arkansas was more conservative than the national entity. Two of Arkansas' three Democratic Representatives at the time were members of the Blue Dog Coalition, which tends to be more pro-business, pro-military spending, and socially conservative than the Democratic mainstream.

Lincoln was a popular incumbent. In March, she an approval rating of 55%. Lincoln calls herself an advocate for rural America, having grown up on a farm herself. Holt is from Northwest Arkansas, who also lives on a farm. Holt was widely perceived as a long shot. By the end of June, he only raised $29,000, while Lincoln had over $5 million cash on hand. Lincoln won re-election by over 11%.

California 

Incumbent Democrat Barbara Boxer defeated Republican former Secretary of State Bill Jones. Boxer's 6.96 million votes set the record for the most votes cast for one candidate in one state in one election, until it was surpassed by Senator Dianne Feinstein's 7.75 million votes in 2012.

Boxer originally had decided to retire in 2004 but changed her mind to "fight for the right to dissent" against conservatives like Majority Leader Tom DeLay. Jones was widely considered as the underdog. Jones got a major endorsement from the popular Governor Arnold Schwarzenegger. The two major candidates had a debate. Pre-election polling had Boxer leading in double digits. But he never released a single TV ad. Boxer portrayed Jones as too conservative for California, citing his votes in the California Assembly (1982 to 1994) against gun control, increased minimum wage, support for offshore drilling, and a loosening of environmental regulations.

Jones raised about $700,000 more than Boxer during the third quarter, pulling in $2.5 million to Boxer's $1.8 million. But overall, Boxer has raised $16 million to Jones' $6.2 million. And Boxer has spent about $7 million on radio and television ads alone.

The election was not close, with Boxer winning by an authoritative 20 point margin. Jones only performed well in rural parts of the state. Boxer on the other hand won almost all major metropolitan areas in the state. The race was called right when the polls closed at 11:00 P.M. EST, and 7:00 P.M. PTZ. Jones conceded defeat to Boxer at 11:12 P.M. EST, and 7:12 PTZ.

Colorado 

Incumbent Republican Ben Nighthorse Campbell decided to retire instead of seeking a third term. The Democratic Attorney General of Colorado Ken Salazar won the open seat.

Before Campbell's retirement, no prominent Democrat had entered the race, with educator Mike Miles and businessman Rutt Bridges pursuing the Democratic nomination. After Campbell's retirement, many expected popular Republican Governor Bill Owens to enter the race, however he declined to run. Campbell's retirement and Owens' decision not to run prompted a number of prominent Democrats to reexamine the race.

On March 10, the same day Owens announced he would not run, U.S. Congressman Mark Udall entered the race. The next day, state Attorney General Ken Salazar entered the race, leading Udall to immediately withdraw and endorse him. Salazar lost to Mike Miles at the State nominating convention. In spite of this loss, the national Democratic Party backed Salazar with contributions from the DSCC and promotion of Salazar as the only primary candidate.

The two candidates got into an ideological battle, as U.S. Representative Bob Schaffer attacked Pete Coors, former CEO and chairman of Coors Brewing Company, because his company had provided benefits to the partners of its gay and lesbian employees, in addition to promoting its beer in gay bars. Coors defended himself by saying that he was opposed to same-sex marriage, and supported a constitutional amendment to ban it, although he noted that he supported civil unions for gay couples. According to the Rocky Mountain News, Coors described his company's pro-LGBT practices as "good business, separate from politics."  Coors defeated Schaffer with 61% of the vote in the primary, with many analysts citing his high name recognition in the state as a primary factor.

Pete Coors ran as a moderate conservative. However, Salazar was also a moderate and a highly popular State Attorney General. Coors is also a great-grandson of Adolph Coors, founder of the brewing company. His father is Joseph Coors, president of the company and founding member of The Heritage Foundation, a conservative think tank. Salazar narrowly won the open seat. It was one of only two Democratic pickups in the 2004 Senate elections; Illinois was the other.

According to the non-partisan OpenSecrets, Coors gave his own campaign $1,213,657 and received individual donations of $60,550 from other Coors family members.

A state record of over $11 million was raised during the election.

Connecticut

Incumbent Democrat Chris Dodd won re-election for a fifth term, beating Republican Jack Orchulli, CEO and co-founder of a Michael Kors's apparel company

Chris Dodd was one of the most powerful senators in congress. In the election cycle, Dodd raised over $7 million. His top five contributors were Bear Stearns, Citigroup, National Westminster Bank, Lehman Brothers, and Goldman Sachs.

Republican nominee, Jack Orchulli, ran as fiscal conservative and social moderate. He broke ranks with his party on gay marriage and abortion. That put him on the same side as most voters in the blue state of Connecticut. He often talked about a "broken education system." He argued that Dodd hasn't done anything in his 30 years in congress to fix such issues as traffic problems in Fairfield County.

Orchulli launched a statewide TV ad campaign in September, as he spent over $1.1 million and pledged to spend "whatever it takes" if polls show he is gaining ground on Dodd.

Florida 

Incumbent Democrat Bob Graham retired after three terms. The primary elections were held on August 31, 2004. Republican Mel Martínez won the open seat, beating Democrat Betty Castor, former president of the University of South Florida, former Education Commissioner of Florida, and former state senator. Martínez, a former U.S. Secretary of Housing and Urban Development, was supported by the Bush Administration.

Until the spring of 2004, Castor's fundraising was much slower than her Democratic and Republican rivals. In the spring, the campaign hired fundraising staff from the defunct presidential campaigns of Howard Dean and Bob Graham, and subsequently posted much higher fundraising numbers over the summer. Online grassroots techniques devised for the Dean campaign (Castor became a Dean Dozen candidate in August) were one contributing factor: another was the support of EMILY's List, which named Castor as its highest-rated candidate for the 2004 election cycle, even when her support for banning intact dilation and extraction (D&X) abortions was not in line with the EMILY's List support for woman's issues. The latter was a source of criticism during the August primary heat - a complaint was filed by a Deutsch supporter with the Federal Election Commission accusing inappropriate coordination with EMILY's List. The complaint was dismissed by the Federal Election Commission in 2005.

Castor's handling of Sami Al-Arian became another source of criticism during the campaign. In June, The American Democracy Project, a 527 group founded by Bernie Friedman, began attacking Castor's handling of the incident, alleging that she had sufficient evidence to fire Al-Arian in the mid-1990s. Castor responded by stating that she never had sufficient evidence to fire Al-Arian, who was a tenured professor at the time. On June 29, Senator Graham, who had previously remained outside of the Al-Arian controversy, released a statement that "Betty Castor acted appropriately as President of the University of South Florida to deal with Sami Al-Arian": later, Graham and Senator Bill Nelson brokered an agreement between the Democratic candidates to refrain from negative campaigning against each other, although this agreement appeared to break down in the final weeks of the race, when Deutsch launched attack ads on television.

Despite these controversies, Castor won the Democratic nomination on August 31. She was defeated, however, by Republican candidate Mel Martínez in a close race on November 2, 2004. The overwhelming support for Martínez among Latinos effectively counterbalanced Castor's relatively high popularity among swing voters throughout the state.

There was some speculation that Castor would run for Governor of Florida in 2006 to replace Jeb Bush, who was ineligible for re-election due to term limits, but she announced in 2005 that she would not be a candidate.

Georgia 

Incumbent Democrat Zell Miller retired. Democratic U.S. Representative Denise Majette became both the first African American and the first woman to be nominated for the U.S. Senate in Georgia. Republican U.S. Representative Johnny Isakson won the open seat.

The results were almost a complete reversal from the previous election in 2000.

Majette's announcement that she would seek to replace Miller also caught Democrats by surprise, as she was not on anyone's call list when Democrats began seeking a candidate to replace Miller. Further skepticism among Democrats about the viability of her candidacy surfaced when she announced that "God" had told her to run for the Senate. She received important endorsements from U.S. Senators Mary Landrieu of Louisiana and Debbie Stabenow of Michigan, along with many others in Washington who campaigned and raised money for Majette. Her Senate campaign slogan was "I'll be nobody's Senator, but yours."

A number of factors led to Majette's loss. These include her late start, her valuable time and money spent in the runoff, larger conservative turnout from a proposed constitutional amendment banning same-sex marriages (which Majette opposed), the popularity of President George W. Bush in Georgia, and her lack of experience (being a one-term congresswoman).

Hawaii 

Incumbent Democrat U.S. Senator Daniel Inouye won re-election to an eighth term over Republican, Campbell Cavasso, a former state representative.

Inouye won every single county with at least 70% of the vote. His best performance was in Kauai County, where he won with an estimated 80%; also was Cavasso's weakest performance, getting just 16.5% of the vote there.

Idaho 

Incumbent Republican Mike Crapo won a second term in a landslide after no one filed for the Democratic nomination. Democrat Scott McClure conducted a write-in campaign but only received 4,136 votes, or about 1% of those cast.

Crapo won every county with over 95% of the vote. His weakest performance by far was in Latah County, where he got 95.6% of the vote to McClure's 4.4%.

Illinois 

Incumbent Republican Peter Fitzgerald decided to retire after one term. The Democratic and Republican primary elections were held in March, which included a total of 15 candidates who combined to spend a record total of over $60 million seeking the open seat.

State Senator and future President Barack Obama won the Democratic primary and Jack Ryan won the Republican primary. Ryan later withdrew from the race four days after the Chicago Tribune persuaded a California court to release child custody records. The Illinois Republican State Central Committee chose former Diplomat Alan Keyes to replace Ryan as the Republican candidate.

The election was the first for the U.S. Senate in which both major party candidates were African American. Obama's 43% margin of victory was the largest in the state history of U.S. Senate elections. The inequality in the candidates spending for the fall elections – $14,244,768 by Obama and $2,545,325 by Keyes – is also among the largest in history in both absolute and relative terms.

Fitzgerald's predecessor, Democrat Carol Moseley Braun, declined to run. Barack Obama, a member of the Illinois Senate since 1997 and an unsuccessful 2000 Democratic primary challenger to four-term incumbent U.S. Rep. Bobby Rush for Rush's U.S House seat, launched a campaign committee at the beginning of July 2002 to run for the U.S. Senate, 21 months before the March 2004 primary, and two months later had David Axelrod lined up to do his campaign media. Obama formally announced his candidacy on January 21, 2003, four days after former U.S. Sen. Carol Moseley Braun announced she would not seek a rematch with U.S. Sen. Peter Fitzgerald.

On April 15, 2003, with six Democrats already running and three Republicans threatening to run against him, incumbent Fitzgerald announced he would not seek a second term in 2004, and three weeks later popular Republican former Governor Jim Edgar declined to run, leading to wide open Democratic and Republican primary races with 15 candidates, including 7 millionaires (triggering the first application of the Millionaires' Amendment of the 2002 McCain–Feingold Act), in the most expensive Senate primary in U.S. history.

Obama touted his legislative experience and early public opposition to the Iraq War to distinguish himself from his Democratic primary rivals. Illinois Comptroller Dan Hynes won the endorsement of the AFL–CIO.  Obama succeeded in obtaining the support of three of the state's largest and most active member unions: AFSCME, SEIU, and the Illinois Federation of Teachers. Hynes and multimillionaire former securities trader Blair Hull each won the endorsements of two of the nine Democratic Illinois members of the US House of Representatives. Obama had the endorsements of four: Jesse Jackson, Jr., Danny Davis, Lane Evans, and Jan Schakowsky.

Obama surged into the lead after he finally began television advertising in Chicago in the final three weeks of the campaign, which was expanded to downstate Illinois during the last six days of the campaign. The ads included strong endorsements by the five largest newspapers in Illinois—the Chicago Tribune, Chicago Sun-Times, Daily Herald, The Rockford Register Star, and Peoria Journal Star—and a testimonial by Sheila Simon that Obama was "cut from that same cloth" as her father, the late former U.S. Senator Paul Simon, who had planned to endorse and campaign for Obama before his unexpected death in December 2003.

On March 16, 2004, Obama won the Democratic primary by an unexpected landslide—receiving 53% of the vote, 29% ahead of his nearest Democratic rival, with a vote total that nearly equaled that of all eight Republican candidates combined—which overnight made him a rising star in the national Democratic Party, started speculation about a presidential future, and led to the reissue of his memoir, Dreams from My Father. The Democratic primary election, including seven candidates who combined to spend over $46 million, was the most expensive U.S. Senate primary election in history.

GOP frontrunner Jack Ryan had divorced actress Jeri Ryan in 1999, and the records of the divorce were sealed at their mutual request. Five years later, when Ryan's Senate campaign began, the Chicago Tribune newspaper and WLS-TV, the local ABC affiliate, sought to have the records released.  On March 3, 2004, several of Ryan's GOP primary opponents urged Ryan to release the records.  Both Ryan and his wife agreed to make their divorce records public, but not make the child custody records public, claiming that the custody records could be harmful to their son if released.  Ryan went on to win the GOP primary on March 16, 2004 defeating his nearest competitor, Jim Oberweis, by twelve percentage points.

Ryan was a proponent of across-the-board tax cuts and tort reform, an effort to limit payout in medical malpractice lawsuits. He was also a proponent of school choice and supported vouchers for private school students.

Oberweis's 2004 campaign was notable for a television commercial where he flew in a helicopter over Chicago's Soldier Field, and claimed enough illegal immigrants came into America in a week (10,000 a day) to fill the stadium's 61,500 seats. Oberweis was also fined $21,000 by the Federal Election Commission for a commercial for his dairy that ran during his 2004 Senate campaign. The FEC ruled that the commercial wrongly benefited his campaign and constituted a corporate contribution, thus violating campaign law.

As a result of the GOP and Democratic primaries, Democrat Barack Obama was pitted against Republican Jack Ryan.

Ryan trailed Obama in early polls, after the media reported that Ryan had assigned Justin Warfel, a Ryan campaign worker, to track Obama's appearances. The tactic backfired when many people, including Ryan's supporters, criticized this activity. Ryan's spokesman apologized, and promised that Warfel would give Obama more space.  Obama acknowledged that it is standard practice to film an opponent in public, and Obama said he was satisfied with Ryan's decision to have Warfel back off.

As the campaign progressed, the lawsuit brought by the Chicago Tribune to open child custody files from Ryan's divorce was still continuing. Barack Obama's backers emailed reporters about the divorce controversy, but refrained from on-the-record commentary. On March 29, 2004, Los Angeles Superior Court Judge Robert Schnider ruled that several of the Ryans' divorce records should be opened to the public, and ruled that a court-appointed referee would later decide which custody files should remain sealed to protect the interests of Ryan's young child. A few days later, on April 2, 2004, Barack Obama changed his position about the Ryans' soon-to-be-released divorce records, and called on Democrats to not inject them into the campaign.

On June 22, 2004, after receiving the report from the court appointed referee, the judge released the files that were deemed consistent with the interests of Ryan's young child. In those files, Jeri Ryan alleged that Jack Ryan had taken her to sex clubs in several cities, intending for them to have sex in public.

The decision to release the files generated much controversy because it went against both parents' direct request, and because it reversed the earlier decision to seal the papers in the best interest of the child. Jim Oberweis, Ryan's defeated GOP opponent, commented that "these are allegations made in a divorce hearing, and we all know people tend to say things that aren't necessarily true in divorce proceedings when there is money involved and custody of children involved."

Although their sensational nature made the revelations fodder for tabloid and television programs specializing in such stories, the files were also newsworthy because of questions about whether Ryan had accurately described the documents to GOP party leaders.  Prior to release of the documents, Ryan had told leading Republicans that five percent of the divorce file could cause problems for his campaign. But after the documents were released, GOP officials including state GOP Chair Judy Baar Topinka said they felt Ryan had misleadingly indicated the divorce records would not be embarrassing.

That charge of dishonesty led to intensifying calls for Ryan's withdrawal, though Topinka, who was considering running herself, said after the June 25 withdrawal that Ryan's "decision was a personal one" and that the state GOP had not pressured Ryan to drop out.  Ryan's campaign ended less than a week after the custody records were opened, and Ryan officially filed the documentation to withdraw on July 29, 2004.  Obama was left without an opponent.

The Illinois Republican State Central Committee chose former diplomat Alan Keyes to replace Ryan as the Republican candidate. Keyes, a conservative Republican from Maryland, faced an uphill battle. First, Keyes had few ties to Illinois political leaders. Second, the lack of an opponent allowed Obama to campaign throughout the more conservative downstate regions to build up name recognition. Third, Keyes was seen as a carpetbagger, only establishing legal residency in Calumet City, Illinois days before running.

The Chicago Tribune in an editorial, stated that "Mr. Keyes may have noticed a large body of water as he flew into O'Hare. That is called Lake Michigan." In 2000, Keyes attacked Hillary Clinton for running for US Senator from New York even though she had never lived there, calling her a carpetbagger. Keyes attacked Barack Obama for voting against a bill that would have outlawed a form of late-term abortion.

Obama ran the most successful Senate campaign in 2004, and was so far ahead in polls that he soon began to campaign outside of Illinois in support of other Democratic candidates. He gave large sums of campaign funds to other candidates and the Democratic Senatorial Campaign Committee and sent many of his volunteers to work on other races, including that of eventual three-term Congresswoman Melissa Bean who defeated then-Congressman Phil Crane in that year's election. Obama and Keyes differed on many issues including school vouchers and tax cuts, both of which Keyes supported and Obama opposed.

The Obama-Keyes race was one of the first to be called on Election Day, November 2, 2004.

At the start of Keyes's candidacy in August, Keyes had 24% support in the polls. He received 27% of the vote in the November general election to Obama's 70%.

Following the election, Keyes refused to call Obama to congratulate him. Media reports claimed that Keyes also failed to concede the race to Obama. Two days after the election, a  Two days after the electionradio interviewer asked Keyes whether he had conceded the race. Keyes replied, "Of course I've conceded the race. I mean, I gave my speech to that effect."

On the radio program, Keyes explained that his refusal to congratulate Obama was "not anything personal," but was meant to make a statement against "extend[ing] false congratulations to the triumph of what we have declared to be across the line." He said that Obama's position on moral issues regarding life and the family had crossed that line. "I'm supposed to make a call that represents the congratulations toward the triumph of that which I believe ultimately stands for ... a culture evil enough to destroy the very soul and heart of my country? I can't do this. And I will not make a false gesture," Keyes said.

Indiana 

Incumbent Democrat Evan Bayh won re-election to a second term, beating Republican Marvin Scott, a professor at Butler University.

In September, Bayh had $6.5 million cash on hand. Scott's strategy of trying to paint Bayh as too liberal failed to gain traction. 
Bayh was viewed early in 2004 as a serious vice presidential candidate for John Kerry. Bayh was on the final shortlist for a Kerry running mate, but North Carolina Senator John Edwards was chosen as Kerry's running mate.

Bayh won 86 of Indiana's counties compared to 6 for Scott.

Iowa 

Incumbent Republican Chuck Grassley won a fifth term, beating former Democratic Iowa State Senator Arthur A. Small. Though this election coincided with the highly competitive presidential election in Iowa, Grassley was in little danger of losing his seat and defeated Small handily.

Kansas 

Incumbent Republican Sam Brownback won re-election to a second term over Democratic railroad engineer Lee Jones.

Though Robert Conroy won the Democratic nomination, he dropped out of the race shortly after becoming the nominee, noting that he expected Jones to win and was tired of campaigning. The Kansas Democratic Party selected Lee Jones as the replacement candidate.

Brownback raised $2.5 million for his re-election campaign, while Jones raised only $90,000. Kansas last elected a Democratic senator in 1932. Brownback was very popular in the state.

Kentucky 

Incumbent Republican Jim Bunning won re-election to a second term. Democratic primary front runner Paul E. Patton, the governor, saw his career implode in a scandal over an extramarital affair. Eventually, the Democrats settled on Daniel Mongiardo, a relatively unknown doctor and state senator from Hazard, Kentucky.

During his re-election bid in 2004, controversy erupted when Bunning described Mongiardo as looking "like one of Saddam Hussein's sons." Bunning apologized, then later went on to declare that Mongiardo's "thugs" had assaulted his wife.

Bunning had an estimated $4 million campaign war chest, while Mongiardo had only $600,000. The Democrats began increasing financial support to Mongiardo when it became apparent that Bunning's bizarre behavior was costing him votes, purchasing more than $800,000 worth of additional television airtime on his behalf.

The November 2 election was one of the closest in Kentucky history. The race turned out to be very close, with Mongiardo leading with as many as 80% of the returns coming in. However, Bunning eventually won by just over one percentage point. Some analysts felt that because of President George Bush's 20% margin of victory in the state, Bunning was able to effectively ride the President's coattails to victory.

Louisiana 

Incumbent Democrat John Breaux retired. Republican U.S. Representative David Vitter won the jungle primary over Democratic U.S. Representative Chris John with 51% of the vote and avoided a runoff.

Breaux endorsed Chris John prior to the jungle primary.

During the campaign, Vitter was accused by a member of the Louisiana Republican State Central Committee of having had a lengthy affair with a prostitute in New Orleans. Vitter responded that the allegation was "absolutely and completely untrue" and that it was "just crass Louisiana politics." The allegation later turned out to be true.

Vitter won the Louisiana jungle primary with 51% of the vote, avoiding the need for a runoff. John received 29.2% of the vote and Kennedy (no relation to the Massachusetts Kennedys), took 14.9%.

Vitter won at least a plurality in 56 of Louisiana's 64 parishes. John carried nine parishes, all but two of which (Iberville and Orleans) are part of the House district he represented.

Kennedy changed parties and ran as Republican in 2008 against Louisiana's senior senator, Democrat Mary Landrieu. Landrieu was re-elected. Kennedy succeeded Vitter when he won the 2016 election for the seat over Democrat Foster Campbell.

Vitter was the first Republican in Louisiana to be popularly elected as a U.S. Senator. The previous Republican Senator, William Pitt Kellogg, was chosen by the state legislature in 1876, in accordance with the process used before the Seventeenth Amendment to the United States Constitution went into effect in 1914.

Maryland 

Incumbent Democrat Barbara Mikulski won re-election to a fourth term over Republican State Senator E. J. Pipkin.

Missouri 

Incumbent Republican Kit Bond won re-election to a fourth term over Nancy Farmer, State Treasurer of Missouri and  former Missouri State Representative

Nevada 

Incumbent Democrat Harry Reid, the Senate Minority Whip, won re-election to a fourth term over Republican anti-gay marriage activist Richard Ziser.

New Hampshire 

Incumbent Republican Judd Gregg won re-election to his third term, easily beating Democratic activist Doris Haddock.

New York 

Incumbent Democrat Chuck Schumer won re-election to his second term, easily beating Republican Howard Mills.

North Carolina 

Incumbent Democrat John Edwards decided to retire from the Senate, ran unsuccessfully for the 2004 Democratic Party presidential nomination, and became his party's vice presidential nominee. Republican Richard Burr won the open seat.

Erskine Bowles won the Democratic Party's nomination unopposed. He had been the party's nominee for the state's other Senate seat in 2002.

Both major-party candidates engaged in negative campaign tactics, with Bowles' campaign attacking Burr for special interest donations and his positions on trade legislation, and Burr's campaign attacking Bowles for his connections to the Clinton administration. Both attacks had basis in reality: Burr's campaign raised funds from numerous political action committees and at least 72 of the 100 largest Fortune 500 companies, while Bowles departed from the Clinton administration in the midst of the Monica Lewinsky scandal.

Burr won the election by 4%. He joined the Senate in January 2005. Bowles went on to become the president of the UNC system.

North Dakota 

Incumbent Democrat Byron Dorgan won re-election to a third term over Republican attorney Mike Liffrig

Ohio 

Incumbent Republican George Voinovich won re-election to a second term over Democrat Eric Fingerhut, state senator and former U.S. Representative from Ohio's 19th congressional district.

A popular U.S. Senator, Voinovich was the heavy favorite to win the election. He had over $9 million in the bank, while his opponent barely had $1.5 million. Fingerhut's campaign was overshadowed by the possible campaign of Democrat and former mayor of Cincinnati Jerry Springer, who eventually declined to run.

Voinovich was considered a moderate on some issues. He supported gun control and amnesty for illegal immigrants.

Surprisingly, Voinovich's biggest advantage was getting support from the most Democratic-leaning county in the state, Cuyahoga County, Ohio. Kerry carried it with almost 67% of the vote, by far his best performance in the state in 2004. It is the home of Cleveland and it is also most populous county in the state. Voinovich was a former mayor of Cleveland. In addition, he catered to Cleveland's large Jewish population by visiting Israel six times as a first-term U.S. Senator. He also consistently voted for aid to Israel through foreign appropriations bills. He's supported resolutions reaffirming Israel's right to self-defense and condemned Palestinian terrorist attacks. In addition, Fingerhut's home base was in the Cleveland area, and therefore he had to cut in through the incumbent's home base in order to even make the election close.

In a September University of Cincinnati poll, the incumbent lead 64% to 34%. In an October ABC News poll, Voinovich was winning 60% to 35%. He led across almost all demographic groups Only among Democrats, non-whites, liberals, and those who pick health care as #1 issue favor Fingerhut. It should be noted that the election coincided with the presidential election, where Ohio was a swing state. 27% of Voinovich's supporters preferred U.S. Senator John Kerry for president.

Oklahoma 

Incumbent Republican Don Nickles decided to retire instead of seeking a fifth term. Republican nominee Tom Coburn won the open seat, beating Brad Carson, a Democratic U.S. Representative

Kirk Humphreys, the former mayor of Oklahoma City, ran for the United States Senate with institutional conservative support, namely from Senators Don Nickles and Jim Inhofe, as well as former Congressman J. C. Watts. However, Coburn received support from the Club for Growth and conservative activists within Oklahoma. Humphreys noted, "[Coburn  is] kind of a cult hero in the conservative portion of our party, not just in Oklahoma. You can't get right of the guy." Much of Coburn's celebrity within the Republican Party came from his tenure in Congress, where he battled House Speaker Newt Gingrich, who he argued was moving the party to the center of the political spectrum due to their excessive federal spending. Coburn's maverick nature culminated itself in 2000 when he backed conservative activist Alan Keyes for President rather than George W. Bush or John McCain.

Ultimately, Coburn triumphed over Humphreys, Anthony, and Hunt in the primary, winning every county in Oklahoma except for tiny Harmon County.

Carson and Coburn engaged each other head-on in one of the year's most brutal Senate contests. Coburn and the National Republican Senatorial Committee attacked Carson for being too liberal for Oklahoma and for being a vote in lockstep with John Kerry, Hillary Clinton, and Ted Kennedy. To drive the point home, one television advertisement aired by the Coburn campaign accused Carson of being "dangerously liberal" and not supporting the War on Terrorism. Coburn was aided in this effort by the fact that the Kerry campaign did not contest the state of Oklahoma and that incumbent President George W. Bush was expected to win Oklahoma comfortably. This was compounded by the fact that Vice-President Dick Cheney campaigned for Coburn and appeared in several television advertisements for him. Carson countered by emphasizing his Stilwell roots and his moderation, specifically, bringing attention to the fact that he fought for greater governmental oversight of nursing home care for the elderly. Carson responded to the attacks against him by countering that his opponent had committed Medicaid fraud years prior, in an event that reportedly left a woman sterilized without her consent. Ultimately, however, Carson was not able to overcome Oklahoma's conservative nature and Senator Kerry's abysmal performance in Oklahoma, and he was defeated by Coburn by 11.5%. As of 2022, the result remains the closest the Democrats have come to winning a Senate election in Oklahoma since Republican Don Nickles was first elected to the Senate by 8.7% in 1980.

Oregon 

Incumbent Democrat Ron Wyden won re-election to a second full term over Republican rancher Al King,

Pennsylvania 

Incumbent Republican Arlen Specter won re-election to a fifth term.

Democrats had difficulty recruiting top tier candidates against the popular Specter. Among the Democrats to decline to run for the nomination were Treasurer (and former Republican) Barbara Hafer, Public Utilities Commissioner John Hanger, real estate mogul Howard Hanna, State Representative (and also former Republican) John Lawless, and State Senator (and future Congresswoman) Allyson Schwartz.

Congressman Hoeffel ended up running unopposed for the Democratic nomination. Software businessman Charlie Crystle was considered a strong possible candidate, but he dropped out before the election.

Specter faced a primary challenge from U.S. Representative Pat Toomey. Despite the state Republican Party's strong history of embracing a moderate philosophy, the influence of conservatism among rank-and-file members had been steadily growing for decades; because of his liberal social views, Specter was often considered to be a "Republican in Name Only" by the right. Although Specter had a huge fundraising advantage, Toomey was aided by $2 million of advertising from the Club for Growth, a conservative political action committee that focuses on fiscal issues and targets moderate Republican incumbents.  Toomey criticized Specter as a spendthrift on economic policy and as out of touch with his own party on social issues. Although Toomey had difficulty with name recognition early in the campaign, he built huge momentum over the final weeks preceding the primary, and Specter appeared to have transitioned from having a comfortable lead to being behind his challenger 

Specter received a huge boost from the vocal support of President George W. Bush; most of the state's Republican establishment also closed ranks behind Specter. This included Pennsylvania's other U.S. Senator, Rick Santorum, who was noted for his social conservative views. Many Republicans at the state and national level feared that if Toomey beat Specter, he wouldn't be able to defend the seat against his Democratic opponent.

For Democrats, hope of winning the election centered on Toomey's defeat of Specter. However, after the challenge from the right failed, enthusiasm from the party establishment waned and Hoeffel had difficulty matching the name recognition and fundraising power of his opponent   Despite contempt from conservatives, Specter enjoyed high levels of support from independent voters and, as in previous elections, a surprisingly large crossover from Democratic voters. Even in the areas in which Toomey performed best in the Republican primary (mainly the state's conservative, rural center), Specter performed well. Except for his large margin of victory in almost uniformly Democratic Philadelphia, Hoeffel was crushed at the polls; his only other wins came by close margins in three metro Pittsburgh counties; although President Bush proved to be unpopular in the state, voters were not willing to abandon Specter over party affiliation. Toomey would go on to elect in the U.S. Senate in 2010.

South Carolina 

Incumbent Democrat Fritz Hollings decided to retire. Jim DeMint, a Republican U.S. Representative won the open seat over Democrat Inez Tenenbaum, the South Carolina Superintendent of Education.

The Senate election two years earlier in 2002 did not have a primary election because the South Carolina Republicans were more preoccupied with the gubernatorial contest, despite having the first open senate seat in 40 years.  The retirement of Democratic Senator Fritz Hollings gave the Republicans an opportunity to pick up the seat and with no other interesting positions up for election in 2004, a crowded field developed in the Republican primary.  Furthermore, the Republicans were motivated by having President Bush at the top of the ticket enabling them to ride his coattails to victory.

Former Governor David Beasley, from the Pee Dee, entered the race and quickly emerged as the frontrunner because of his support from the evangelical voters.  However, during his term as governor from 1994 to 1998 he had greatly angered the electorate by proposing to remove the Confederate Naval Jack from the dome of the statehouse and by being against the adoption of a state lottery to provide for college scholarships. Both positions led to the loss of his re-election in 1998 and the issues continued to trouble him in the Senate race.

The battle for second place in the primary was between Upstate congressman, Jim DeMint, and Charleston developer Thomas Ravenel.  DeMint was able to squeak out a second-place finish because Charlie Condon, a former Attorney General of South Carolina, split the Lowcountry vote with Ravenel thus providing DeMint the margin he needed.  In addition, while many voters were attracted to the Ravenel campaign and felt that he had a future in politics, they believed that he should set his sights on a less high-profile office first before trying to become senator.  Resigned to defeat, Ravenel endorsed DeMint in the runoff election.

In the runoff election on June 22, 2004, DeMint scored a surprising victory over Beasley.  Ravenel's endorsement of DeMint proved crucial as the Lowcountry counties heavily went for the Representative from the Upstate.  Also, Beasley had burnt too many bridges while governor and was unable to increase his share of the vote in the runoff.

DeMint entered the general election campaign severely weakened from the primary fight, having spent most of his campaign funds.  He stressed to the voters that he would follow conservative principles and provide an important Republican vote in the closely divided Senate.  Democrats fared poorly in statewide elections in South Carolina, so Tenenbaum tried to make the race about issues rather than party identification.  She attacked DeMint's support of the FairTax proposal because it would increase the sales tax by 23%.  The election victory by DeMint merely cemented South Carolina's shift to the Republican column as the best candidate the Democrats could offer was soundly defeated by the typical 10 point margin.

 
 

 

 Nwangaza ran under the Independence Party in Aiken and Calhoun counties; her totals are combined.

South Dakota 

In the 2004 Congressional elections, Daschle lost his seat to Republican challenger and former U.S. Representative John Thune in a bitterly contested battle. Thune prevailed by a narrow 50.6–49.4% margin, of 4,508 votes. Senate Majority Leader Bill Frist visited South Dakota to campaign for Thune, breaking an unwritten tradition that one party's leader in the Senate would not campaign directly for the other's defeat. Daschle's loss resulted in the first ousting of a majority or minority leader since 1952 when Arizona Senator Ernest McFarland lost his seat to Barry Goldwater. Daschle's Senate term expired on January 3, 2005.

Throughout the campaign, Thune, along with Frist, President Bush, and Vice President Cheney, frequently accused Daschle of being the "chief obstructionist" of Bush's agenda and charged him with using filibusters to block confirmation of several of Bush's nominees to the federal judiciary. Thune also used moral values such as issues surrounding same-sex marriage and abortion to convince South Dakota voters that Daschle's positions on such topics were out-of-sync with the state's residents. The Republican candidate also drove home his strong support for the President while blasting Daschle for his vehement opposition to Bush. He attempted to sway voters by remembering that Bush won South Dakota in a landslide in 2000 and had a very high job-approval rating among South Dakotans. His opponent, the Minority Leader, repeatedly argued that he was funneling money into South Dakota for vital federal highway and water pet projects.

Daschle responded to Thune's claim that he was a partisan anti-Bush obstructionist by pointing to his action just nine days after the September 11 attacks when he hugged President Bush on the Senate floor following Bush's address to Congress and the nation. He also hit back by alleging that Thune wanted to "rubber stamp what the administration is doing." Daschle's use of the video of his embrace of Bush forced the Republican National Committee to demand that the ad be pulled, claiming that it suggests that Bush endorses Daschle. Shortly following the airing of the ad, in a nationally televised debate on NBC's Meet the Press, Thune accused Daschle of "emboldening the enemy" in his skepticism of the Iraq War.

Daschle also noticeably relied very heavily on the power of incumbency to win a fourth term. Some also argued that Stephanie Herseth's election to the state's only House seat hurt Daschle, as voters may not have been comfortable sending an all-Democratic delegation to Congress for the first time in many decades. Accusations that Daschle was possibly considering no longer being an official resident of South Dakota was believed to have offended voters there. Others have analyzed that Daschle's lengthy consideration and eventual rejection of a potential run for the presidency in 2004 took a toll on South Dakotans, who felt betrayed and used by Daschle as a result.

When the race began in early 2004, Daschle led by 7 points in January and February. By May, his lead minimized to just 2 points and into the summer polls showed a varying number of trends: either Daschle held a slim 1- to 2-point lead or Thune held a slim 1- to 2-point lead or the race was tied right down the middle. Throughout September, Daschle led Thune by margins of 2 to 5 percent while during the entire month of October into the November 2 election, most polls showed that Thune and Daschle were dead even, usually tied 49–49 among likely voters. Some polls showed either Thune or Daschle leading by extremely slim margins.

Thune was an aide to former Senator James Abdnor, the man Daschle defeated in 1986 to gain his seat in the Senate.

Daschle spent a great deal of time and energy campaigning for his fellow Democrat Tim Johnson in 2002, who barely defeated Thune by 524 votes. He argued that by re-electing Johnson, South Dakota would be better off because Johnson would help to keep Daschle Majority Leader. However, in the end, while Johnson won, other states voted for enough Republicans that Daschle was no longer majority leader. Furthermore, Thune's whisker-close defeat in 2002 freed him up to run against Daschle in 2004. Had Daschle not put his considerable weight to re-electing Johnson, it seems very likely that Thune would have beaten Johnson, leaving Daschle without a strong challenger for the upcoming election and making his re-election a certainty.

Utah 

Incumbent Republican Bob Bennett won re-election to a third term easily beating Democrat Paul Van Dam, former Attorney General of Utah and former Salt Lake County District Attorney

Vermont 

Incumbent Democrat Patrick Leahy won re-election to a sixth term.

Washington 

Incumbent Democrat Patty Murray won re-election. She became only the fourth Washington senator to win 3 consecutive terms, just after fellow Democrats Warren G. Magnuson and Scoop Jackson.

Term limits became an issue in the campaign, as Democrats seized on Nethercutt's broken term-limits pledge that he had made when he unseated Speaker Tom Foley in 1994. Nethercutt was also hampered by his lack of name recognition in the more densely populated western part of the state, home to two-thirds of the state's population. Washington has not elected a senator from east of the Cascades since Miles Poindexter in 1916. Other important issues included national security and the war in Iraq. Nethercutt supported the invasion of Iraq, while Murray opposed it. Nethercutt was a heavy underdog from the start, and his campaign never gained much traction. In November, he lost by 12 points, receiving 43 percent of the vote to Murray's 55 percent.

Wisconsin 

Incumbent Democrat Russ Feingold won re-election to a third term.

Republican Tim Michels, businessman and army veteran insisted he has more real world experience than Feingold, someone he called an "extreme liberal" who's out of touch with Wisconsin voters. Feingold attacked back by saying that any Republican would be a rubber stamp for President Bush. The incumbent had $2.2 million in the bank, while Michels had already spent $1 million in the primary and had only about $150,000 left.

When the NRSC was finally convinced in October that Michels had a shot, they pledged $600,000 for him.

On October 1, a poll showed Feingold leading 52% to 39%. In mid October, another poll showed Feingold winning 48% to 43%. A poll at the end of the month showed him leading 51% to 36%.

See also
 2004 United States elections
 2004 United States gubernatorial elections
 2004 United States presidential election
 2004 United States House of Representatives elections
 108th United States Congress
 109th United States Congress

Notes

References 
 List of the most expensive senatorial races, via Opensecrets.org
 Election results, via CNN
 United States Election 2004 Web Archive from the U.S. Library of Congress
 
 
 
 
 Elections Division from the Louisiana Secretary of State
 2004 North Dakota U.S. Senate Election results
 JoinCalifornia 2004 General Election
 SmartVoter.org page on the California Senate race.
 Final results from the Secretary of State of California. Wayback Machine